Nataliia Morkvych (born 15 January 1992) is a Ukrainian wheelchair fencer. She won the silver medal in the women's foil A event at the 2020 Summer Paralympics held in Tokyo, Japan.

References 

Living people
1992 births
Sportspeople from Lviv
Ukrainian female foil fencers
Wheelchair fencers at the 2020 Summer Paralympics
Medalists at the 2020 Summer Paralympics
Paralympic silver medalists for Ukraine
Paralympic medalists in wheelchair fencing
Paralympic wheelchair fencers of Ukraine
21st-century Ukrainian women